The 789th Tactical Fighter Squadron is an inactive United States Air Force unit.  During World War II, as the 789th Bombardment Squadron, it was assigned to the 467th Bombardment Group as a Consolidated B-24 Liberator squadron in 1943.  After training in the United States, it moved to the European Theater of Operations the following year, where it participated in the strategic bombing campaign against Germany.  It saw combat until the surrender of Germany in May 1945.  After V-E Day, the squadron returned to the United States and transitioned into the Boeing B-29 Superfortress It was inactivated on 4 August 1946 at Clovis Army Air Field, New Mexico.

The squadron was redesignated the 789th Tactical Fighter Squadron and activated in April 1965 as part of the 33d Tactical Fighter Wing.  It began to train with the McDonnell F-4 Phantom II, but less than three months after activation, it was inactivated and its Phantoms, personnel and mission were transferred to the 40th Tactical Fighter Squadron.

History

World War II

Training in the United States and deployment
The squadron was first activated at Wendover Field, Utah on 1 August 1943 as one of the original four squadrons of the 467th Bombardment Group. It trained with Consolidated B-24 Liberator heavy bombers until February 1944, when it departed for the European Theater of Operations. The air echelon ferried their Liberators to England via the South Atlantic Ferry route.

Combat in Europe
The squadron arrived at its combat station, RAF Rackheath, England, on 11 March 1944, and entered the strategic bombing campaign on 10 April with an attack on a military air base at Bourges.   It attacked targets such as factories at Bonn, Osnabrück and Stuttgart, power generating facilities at Hamm, and the harbor at Kiel.  It also attacked the German aircraft industry at Brunswick, and other objectives.  In September 1944, the squadron spent some time transporting fuel to France to support the Allied advance toward Germany.

The squadron was occasionally diverted from the strategic campaign to engage in air support and air interdiction missions. On D-Day, it attacked shore installations and bridges near Cherbourg Naval Base.  During Operation Cobra, the breakout at Saint Lo, it bombed troop concentrations and supply dumps near Montreuil.  It attacked German lines of communication and fortifications during the Battle of the Bulge from December 1944 through January 1945. It bombed enemy transportation to assist Operation Varsity, the airborne assault across the Rhine in March 1945.  The squadron flew its last combat mission on 25 April 1945.

Return to the United States and inactivation
Following V-E Day, the squadron redeployed to the United States. The squadron began to reassemble at Sioux Falls Army Air Field, South Dakota later in July. The squadron was selected for transition into the Boeing B-29 Superfortress and trained with the new bomber at Alamogordo Army Air Field, New Mexico and Harvard Army Air Field, Nebraska, although Japan had surrendered. The squadron completed its transition into the Superfortress and, in January 1946, moved to Clovis Army Air Field, New Mexico, where it became one of the first units in Strategic Air Command. On 4 August 1946, the squadron was inactivated and its mission, personnel and equipment were transferred to the 352d Bombardment Squadron, which was simultaneously activated.

Fighter operations
As the United States Air Force expanded its McDonnell F-4 Phantom II fleet in April 1965, it activated the 33d Tactical Fighter Wing at Eglin Air Force Base Florida.  Although it was planned that the squadrons of the 33d Wing would be Convair F-102 Delta Dagger squadrons that were inactivating in the Pacific, these squadrons were still winding down their operations, so the 33d was initially formed with the 786th, 787th, 788th and 789th Tactical Fighter Squadron.  The 33d embarked on a program of tactical training with the Phantom.  In June 1965, the squadron was inactivated and its planes and personnel were transferred to the 40th Tactical Fighter Squadron, which moved on paper to Eglin from Yokota Air Base, Japan.

Lineage
 Constituted as the 789th Bombardment Squadron (Heavy) on 19 May 1943
 Activated on 1 August 1943
 Redesignated 789th Bombardment Squadron, Heavy c. 10 August 1944
 Redesignated 789th Bombardment Squadron, Very Heavy on 5 August 1945
 Inactivated on 4 August 1946
 Redesignated 789th Tactical Fighter Squadron on 9 February 1965 and activated (not organized)
 Organized on 1 April 1965
 Inactivated on 20 June 1965

Assignments
 467th Bombardment Group, 1 August 1943 – 4 August 1946
 Tactical Air Command, 9 February 1965 (not organized)
 33d Tactical Fighter Wing, 1 April 1965 – 20 June 1965

Stations

 Wendover Field, Utah, 1 August 1943
 Mountain Home Army Air Field, Idaho, 8 September 1943
 Kearns Army Air Base, Utah 17 October 1943
 Wendover Field, Utah, 2 November 1943 – 12 February 1944
 RAF Rackheath (AAF-145), England, 11 March 1944 – 12 June 1945
 Sioux Falls Army Air Field, South Dakota, 15 July 1945
 Fairmont Army Air Field, Nebraska, 25 July 1945
 Alamogordo Army Air Field, New Mexico, 22 August 1945
 Harvard Army Air Field, Nebraska, 8 September 1945
 Clovis Army Air Field, New Mexico, 7 January–4 August 1946
 Eglin Air Force Base, 1 April 1965 – 20 June 1965

Aircraft
 Consolidated B-24 Liberator, 1943–1945
 Boeing B-17 Flying Fortress, 1945–1946
 Boeing B-29 Superfortress, 1946
 McDonnell F-4 Phantom II, 1965

Campaigns

See also
 B-24 Liberator units of the United States Army Air Forces
 B-17 Flying Fortress units of the United States Army Air Forces
 List of B-29 Superfortress operators
 List of F-4 Phantom II operators

References

Notes

Bibliography

 
 
 
 
 

Bombardment squadrons of the United States Army Air Forces
Military units and formations established in 1943
World War II strategic bombing units